A negative test can relate to:
 A negative medical test, in which the target parameter that was evaluated was not present. It is unrelated to a bad prognosis, but rather whether the test itself worked or not, and a certain parameter that was evaluated was present or not.
 In software testing, a test designed to determine the response of the system outside of normal parameters. It is designed to determine if the system performs error handling with unexpected input.